The Tarndale bully (Gobiomorphus alpinus) is a fish in the family Eleotridae endemic to New Zealand, where it is found only in the Tarndale Lakes.

References

Tarndale bully
Endemic freshwater fish of New Zealand
Fish of the South Island
Taxa named by Gerald Stokell
Tarndale bully